The 5th congressional district of Tennessee is a congressional district in Middle Tennessee.  It has been represented by Republican Andy Ogles since January 2023.

Current boundaries
As of the 2020 United States redistricting cycle, the 5th District comprises a southern portion of Davidson County; portions of Wilson and Williamson Counties; and the entirety of Maury, Lewis, and Marshall Counties.

Characteristics
In the past, the fifth district has been nearly synonymous with Tennessee's capital city, Nashville, as the district has almost always been centered on Nashville throughout the 20th and early 21st centuries. The city is a center for the music, healthcare, publishing, banking and transportation industries, and is home to numerous colleges and universities (its old nickname was "the Athens of the South"). It is also home to the Grand Ole Opry and Country Music Hall of Fame and Museum, earning it the nickname "Music City".

SInce the 2022 election cycle, there is no longer a congressional district centered on the city of Nashville itself.

Political characteristics
Tennessee's 5th is a gerrymandered district designed to favor Republican candidates. Prior to the 2020 House Redistricting Cycle, the district contained the entirety of Davidson County, making it a safe seat for the Democratic Party. Following redistricting, Nashville was split into 3 separate districts, effectively diluting the city's heavily democratic voterbase into the surrounding suburban and rural counties, which lean strongly Republican.

Election results from statewide races 

Results Under Old Lines (2013-2023)

Results Under Old Lines (2003-2013)

History
Following the 1950 census, Tennessee expanded briefly to ten districts. Even though it has since contracted back to nine districts, that marked the beginning of the continuous period where the 5th district was centered on Davidson County/Nashville.

From 1941 to 1957, Nashville was represented by J. Percy Priest, who was the House majority whip in the 81st and 82nd Congresses. A dam in eastern Davidson County and the lake formed by the dam are both named in his memory.

Priest died just before the Election of 1956, and the Democrats turned to Carlton Loser. Loser won that election, and then to two more Congresses after that. Loser appeared to win another Democratic nomination in 1962, but his primary came under investigation for voter fraud, and a court ordered a new election. In this new election, Loser was defeated by former state senator Richard Fulton.

Richard "Dick" Fulton represented the 5th from 1963 until August 1975, when he retired from Congress to become the second mayor of metropolitan Nashville.

Following the 1970 census, while Fulton was representing the district, Tennessee briefly contracted to eight congressional districts. During the 1970s, the district encompassed Davidson, Cheatham, and Robertson counties. This contraction of congressional districts forced the first time in thirty years where Davidson County was not the sole county in the district. (The fifth was only Davidson County from 1943 to 1972.)

Once Fulton was Nashville mayor, he was succeeded in Congress by former state senator Clifford Allen. Allen served for only a term and a half (November 1975 - June 1978) before he died in office due to complications from a heart attack suffered a month earlier.

In the election of 1978, the fifth district selected state senator Bill Boner. He served in Congress for ten years, and then succeeded Fulton as mayor of Nashville.

Boner was succeeded in 1988 by Bob Clement, former president of Cumberland University and son of former governor Frank G. Clement. Clement served seven terms in Congress, where he represented Davidson and Robertson counties. He was one of the 81 Democratic congressmen who voted for the Iraq Resolution of 2002.

Clement did not run for re-election in 2002, as he was running for the open U.S. Senate seat left by retiring Fred Thompson. He won the Democratic nomination easily, but was defeated in the general election by former governor Lamar Alexander. Clement was succeeded in Congress by Jim Cooper, who, like Clement, was also the son of a former governor. Cooper is considered a blue dog Democrat. According to On The Issues, he is deemed "moderate", but is slightly to the left of the political center.

After the 2020 United States redistricting cycle moved the 5th district to the Republican-leaning suburbs to the south of Nashville, Cooper announced that he would not run again in 2022. He was succeeded in Congress by Andy Ogles, the former mayor of Maury County.

List of members representing the district

Recent election results 

 Results Under Old Lines (2013-2023)

'Results Under New Lines (2023-present)'''

Historical district boundaries

See also

Tennessee's congressional districts
List of United States congressional districts

Notes

References

 Congressional Biographical Directory of the United States 1774–present

External links
House of Representatives member information, via Clerk of the United States House of Representatives

05
Davidson County, Tennessee
Wilson County, Tennessee
Cheatham County, Tennessee